Chisholm, also known as Chisholm Mills, is a hamlet in Alberta, Canada within the Municipal District of Lesser Slave River No. 124.

History 
The community has the name of Thomas Chrisholm, an early settler.

During World War II, there was a camp for German prisoners, Camp Chisholm.

2001 Chisholm wildfire 
In the summer of 2001, a major forest fire destroyed ten houses within the hamlet on May 27–28 and 120,000 hectares of timber in the surrounding area.  An investigation conducted by the Province of Alberta alleged that the fire was caused by a CNR train.

Demographics 

See also 
List of communities in Alberta
List of designated places in Alberta
List of hamlets in Alberta

References 

Hamlets in Alberta
Designated places in Alberta
Municipal District of Lesser Slave River No. 124